Ahmet Selçuk İlkan (born 26 October 1955) is a Turkish poet and songwriter.

Life
After high school, İlkan went to Berlin to study architecture and engineering. Later he developed an interest in poetry and enrolled in the Faculty of Language and Literature of Istanbul University.

Published works

Books 
 Ayrılıkların Şairi (Poet of Breakups)
 Yakılacak Şiirler (Poems That Will Be Burned)
 Adım Yalnızlık Benim (My Name Is Loneliness)
 Gitmeler Bana Kaldı (Stay By Me)
 Bir Gülü Sevdim (I Loved a Rose)
 Erkekler Hep Yalnız Ağlar (Men Always Cry Alone)

Albums 
 Mum Işığında (Ayten), 1982
 Şiir Gözlüm (Fahriye Abla), 1984
 Bak Bir Erkek Ağlıyor, 1986
 Bir Beyaz Karanfil, 1988
 O Adam Benim, 1990
 Seni Arıyorum (Allah Kahretsin), 1992
 Şairler Ağlamaz, 1997
 Ayrılıkların Şairi (Sen Vurdun da Ben Ölmedim mi), 2000
 Yakılacak Adam, 2002
 Unutmaktan Geliyorum (Senin Adın Yalan Olsun), 2004
 Seni O Kadar Çok Sevdim Ki (Kanatsa Da İçimi), 2011

Awards
İlkan's poem "Do you remember?" won first prize in a poetry competition sponsored by Life magazine in 1975

References

1955 births
Living people
Turkish poets
Turkish songwriters
Istanbul University alumni